Alcimar Leitão Airport, formerly , was the airport that served Feijó, Brazil until 2008, when the newer Feijó Airport was opened. The airport was later closed and became an urbanized area.

Accidents and incidents
20 October 1968: a Cruzeiro do Sul Douglas C-47 A-25-DK registration PP-SAD had an engine failure and crashed after take-off and while trying to return to Feijó. All 19 passengers and crew died.

Access

References

External links

Defunct airports in Brazil
Airports disestablished in 2008